The 1979 EuroHockey Club Champions Cup, taking place in The Hague, was the sixth edition of Europe's premier field hockey club competition. The format was changed - standings would be determined by a group stage in four triangular groups and subsequent play-offs.

It was won by HC Klein Zwitserland in their second participation, becoming the first Dutch team to win the competition in a final match against the Real Club de Polo from Barcelona.

Group stage

Group A
  Edinburgh HC
  Southgate HC
  Lech Poznań

Group B
  Rüsselsheimer RK
  Slavia Prague
  Basler HC 1911

Group C
  HC Klein Zwitserland
  Guildford HC
  Stade Français

Group D
  Real Club de Polo, Barcelona
  Uccle Sport
  Dynamo Almaty

Play-offs - 1st knockout stage

1st-4th place
 HC Klein Zwitserland 6-0 Edinburgh HC
 Real Club de Polo, Barcelona 1-1 Rüsselsheimer RK (penalty shoot-out: 5-3)

5th-8th place
 Southgate HC 4-0 Guidford HC
 Slavia Prague 2-1 Uccle Sport

9th-12th place
 Dynamo Almaty 3-0 Basler HC 1911
 Stade Français 2-1 Lech Poznań

Play-offs - 2nd knockout stage

Final
 HC Klein Zwitserland 2-1 Real Club de Polo, Barcelona

3rd place
 Rüsselsheimer RK 5-1 Edinburgh HC

5th place
 Southgate HC 3-1 Slavia Prague

7th place
 Uccle Sport 0-0 Guidford HC (penalty shoot-out: 4-2)

9th place
 Dynamo Almaty 5-2 Stade Français

11th place
 Basler HC 1911 3-0 Lech Poznań

Standings
  HC Klein Zwitserland
  Real Club de Polo, Barcelona
  Rüsselsheimer RK
  Edinburgh HC
  Southgate HC (defending champions)
  Slavia Prague
  Uccle Sport
  Guildford HC
  Dynamo Almaty
  Stade Français
  Basler HC 1911
  Lech Poznań

References

See also
European Hockey Federation

EuroHockey Club Champions Cup
International field hockey competitions hosted by the Netherlands
EuroHockey Club Champions Cup
EuroHockey Club Champions Cup